Rocco Benetton (born 29 September 1969) is an Italian entrepreneur publicly known for his role as Chief Executive Officer of championship-winning Formula One Team Benetton.

Personal background
He is the son of Maria Teresa and Luciano Benetton and member of the Italian Benetton family which founded the Benetton Group S.p.A. clothing company in 1965. He is married and the father of three children.

Academic studies
After attending high school in his home town of Treviso, he moved to the United States to study mechanical engineering at Boston University in 1989.

Career in Wall Street
At the end of his studies, Benetton moved to New York City at the beginning of 1994 where he worked in Wall Street for Oppenheimer & Co. and Alpha Investment Management as a hedge fund specialist and later served as managing director.

Career in F1
In 1997, Benetton then moved to Oxford, England where he was appointed chief executive officer of Benetton Formula One, the team racing in the World Formula One Championship. Following the departure of chief executive Flavio Briatore and Michael Schumacher, he was able to lead the team for four years working very closely with "Mr. F1" Bernie Ecclestone into achieving good results. The team, however, was not able to keep up with the financial investment level of the newcomer car manufacturers, so Benetton directed and managed the sale of the BF1 Team to Renault Group for at the time a record agreement in 2000 including the following co-branding exposure for two more F1 seasons.

Entrepreneurial career
After his four-year English experience, Benetton later moved back to his family home town Treviso where he settled with his family and children. Surrounded by a very strong entrepreneurial environment, he founded the companies Zero Rh+ and the Oot Group, a top-of-the-line web company, with the world's largest communication company WPP plc.

In 2003, he also founded Banca del Gottardo Italia, personally acquired a 4% stake in the bank and joined the board together with Alberto Bombasei (Brembo SpA), Domenico Bosatelli (Gewiss SpA) and Tito Lombardini (Gruppo Lombardini). After a very successful development of the business, Banca del Gottardo was acquired in totality by Banca Generali in May 2008.

Through his experience acquired in technology, it was clear to Benetton that the security of new technology was becoming an increasingly prevalent problem and he decided to focus in that direction. In 2013, together with a highly skilled team with international experience from Etnoteam, Value Partners, Value Team, Sun Microsystems, IBM, he founded a research company, Mobisec Group, to develop high-end security for companies in apps and internet of things in general. After five years of research and development, Mobisec was able to go to market to service the top companies in the Italian market. After significant growth in the domestic market, Mobisec USA opened in 2020 in Menlo Park, Palo Alto, California to enhance and develop its own product at a higher level.

Today, Benetton is a very active private investor in many startup companies in Europe, Asia and in the United States.

References

Formula One team principals
1969 births
Living people
Boston University College of Engineering alumni
Benetton people
Rocco
Italian motorsport people
Benetton Formula